Juma Rashed (12 December 1972) is an Emirati football goalkeeper who played for United Arab Emirates in the 2004 AFC Asian Cup.

References 

Living people
Emirati footballers
Al Shabab Al Arabi Club Dubai players
United Arab Emirates international footballers
Association football goalkeepers
1996 AFC Asian Cup players
1997 FIFA Confederations Cup players
2004 AFC Asian Cup players
Footballers at the 1998 Asian Games
UAE Pro League players
1972 births
Asian Games competitors for the United Arab Emirates